Colin C. Campbell is a Canadian entrepreneur who has co-founded several Internet and technology startup companies, including Internet Direct, Tucows, Hostopia, and .Club Domains LLC, the operator of .club.

Career

Campbell has co-founded several Internet and technology companies, including Internet Direct, the domain registrar Tucows, and Hostopia, a website hosting and service provider now owned by Deluxe. He served as Internet Direct's chief executive officer (CEO) from 1994 to 1999 and Tucows' CEO from 1997 to 1999. Campbell is a founding member of the Canadian Internet Registration Authority (CIRA) and served on its board of directors from June 2001 to January 2003. He served Hostopia's president from November 2005 to April 2006 and CEO from January 2001 to February 2008. He is a former director of the Canadian Association of Internet Providers (CAIP).

Campbell is the founder and continues to serve as president and CEO of the domain name registry .Club Domains LLC, which operates the new generic top-level domain (gTLD) string .club. He formed .Club Domains with idea that the .club domain extension would offer unity for those with passions, rather than commercial interests. Campbell co-founded EntrepreneurWiki, an online wiki for entrepreneurs, and is a member of the Entrepreneurs' Organization (EO). After being invited to guest speak at Massachusetts Institute of Technology (MIT) on the topic of entrepreneurship, Campbell received $100,000 in investments funding for .club from an investor who witnessed his speech. In May 2015, Campbell was invited to give the keynote speech on entrepreneurship in China at Solbridge International School of Business at the Beijing Foreign Studies University.

Personal life and recognition
Originally from Toronto, Campbell graduated from the University of Toronto with a Bachelor of Arts in Commerce and now lives in Fort Lauderdale. His work has been recognized by Profit magazine, which named his companies the seventh and second fastest growing in Canada in 1997 and 1998, respectively. In 2005, Profit and Inc. magazines named his company the fastest growing.

References

External links
 

Living people
Year of birth missing (living people)
20th-century Canadian businesspeople
21st-century Canadian businesspeople
Businesspeople from Miami
Businesspeople from Toronto
Canadian business executives
Canadian company founders
Canadian computer businesspeople
Canadian technology chief executives
University of Toronto alumni